"New Generation" is the third and final single from the album Dog Man Star by English rock band Suede, released on 30 January 1995 through Nude Records. It is the first single to feature music by new guitarist Richard Oakes. Though the title track is written by Anderson and departed guitarist Bernard Butler, Oakes contributes on "Together" and "Bentswood Boys". The single reached No. 21 in the UK.

The video for the title song was directed by Richard Heslop, and features the whole band playing in a crowded room surrounded by broken television sets and dilapidated furniture, while a group of children dance or sit around. "New Generation" was the only video from the "Dog Man Star" era where Richard Oakes 'mimes' Bernard Butler's guitar part. It is also notable for its sepia format.

Music & Media wrote: "Brett Anderson, the Bowie of the new generation, excels with a glittering pop song. The voice is put nicely upfront in the production; horns are in the back under layers of guitar." Steve Smith of The Press and Journal rated the single four stars out of five, writing: "another one destined to be a hit for a group still in their early years. Brett Anderson is his usual self on vocals – brilliant." Emma Cochrane of Smash Hits also rated the single four out of five, and called it a "catchy ‘90s anthem" and a "masterpiece." Craig Fitzsimons of Hot Press concurred, writing: "Suede do have one thing in their favour – unerringly catchy, hook-filled songs you can actually hum along to."

Track listings
All songs were written by Brett Anderson and Bernard Butler except where noted.

12-inch vinyl, CD1
 "New Generation"
 "Together" (Anderson, Richard Oakes)
 "Bentswood Boys" (Anderson, Oakes)

CD2
 "New Generation"
 "Animal Nitrate (live)"
 "The Wild Ones (live)"
 "Pantomime Horse (live)"

Cassette
 "New Generation"
 "Together"

References

Suede (band) songs
1995 singles
Song recordings produced by Ed Buller
Songs written by Bernard Butler
Songs written by Brett Anderson